The Waratah is the genus Telopea, of shrubs native to southeastern Australia.

Waratah may also refer to:
 The plant genus Alloxylon, the tree waratahs
 Waratah, New South Wales, a suburb of Newcastle
 Waratah, Tasmania, a town in northwest Tasmania
 Waratah Bay, a bay in Victoria, Australia
 , a steamer that mysteriously disappeared in 1909
 The Warratahs, a country-rock band from New Zealand
 New South Wales Waratahs, a Super Rugby team
 Waratah motorcycles manufactured in Sydney
 Sydney Trains A & B sets, a type of multiple unit electric train in Sydney branded as Waratah
 Waratah (steam tug), part of the Sydney Heritage Fleet
 A type of Steel fence post in New Zealand and Australia

See also
  Waratah West, New South Wales, another suburb of Newcastle
  Waratah-Wynyard Council, a Local Government Area in northwest Tasmania
  Waratah Bay, Victoria, a town is southeast Victoria (Australia)
  Waratah Australian Basketball League in New South Wales
  Waratah National Park, the fictional setting for "Skippy the Bush Kangaroo"